Poplar Spring is a spring in Catoosa County, Georgia, United States.

Poplar Spring was named for a single poplar tree which stood above this spring.

References

Bodies of water of Catoosa County, Georgia
Springs of Georgia (U.S. state)